Terry's is a British chocolate and confectionery maker, formerly based in York, England, until 2005, and re-established in 2019 as Terry's Chocolate Co and based in London. The company was founded in 1767.  The company's headquarters and factory, Terry's Chocolate Works, was closed by Kraft in 2005. Their best known products include Terry's Chocolate Orange (introduced in 1932), and Terry's All Gold box of assorted chocolates (also introduced in the 1930s).

The Terry's brand name has been bought out on many occasions: in 1993 it was bought by Kraft Foods; the Terry's name became part of Mondelēz International in 2012; and in 2016 it was bought by investment company Eurazeo that formed French confectioner .

Products using the Terry's brand name are now produced in the Carambar facilities in Strasbourg.

History

The business began in 1767 as a shop close to Bootham Bar, York, selling cough lozenges, lemon and orange glace fruit, and other sweets. When Robert Berry formed a partnership with William Bayldon the firm took the name Bayldon and Berry and by 1818 the business had moved to 3 St Helen's Square, York.

Joseph Terry, who was born in Pocklington in 1793, went to York to serve as an apprentice apothecary in either Stonegate or Spurriergate. On gaining his certificates, he set up as a chemist in Walmgate. In 1823 he married Harriet Atkinson, who was either a niece or sister-in-law of Robert Berry and after closing his chemist shop he joined the Berry confectionery business, from which William Bayldon had retired in 1821.

In 1825, after the death of Robert Berry, Terry agreed to a new partnership with George Berry; they renamed the business Terry & Berry. The partnership was joined by John Coultherd, but in 1828 George Berry left and the business was renamed Joseph Terry and Company. Two years later Coultherd also left and Terry became the sole owner of the business.

Joseph Terry and Company
Using the skills he learned as a chemist, Joseph developed new lines of confectionery, sugared sweets, candied peel, marmalade, and medicated lozenges. He began using the developing railway network of the North Eastern Railway to distribute his products in the North of England and in London.

After Joseph Terry died in 1850 the company was in the control of solicitors and executors until 1854 when it was handed over to his sons Joseph Jnr, Robert, and John. Joseph quickly expanded the business; four years later he moved production to a leased site at Clementhorpe, beside the River Ouse. This allowed easy shipment of raw products into the new production facility from the Humber Estuary; twice weekly a steam ship brought ingredients, including sugar and cocoa, as well as coal to power the new steam-powered machinery. Joseph was knighted for his services to industry in 1887 and became Lord Mayor of York for the fourth time in 1890. He renamed the business Joseph Terry & Sons and it became a limited liability company in 1895. The Grade II listed St Helen's Square premises was retained by the company as a shop and restaurant until 1980 after which it was sold and the restaurant was converted into offices.

Joseph Terry and Sons

When Sir Joseph died in 1898 he was succeeded by his sons Frank and Thomas Terry and the following year Terry's Neapolitans were launched. Thomas died following a road accident in 1910 and his son Noel joined the company the following year. In the First World War Noel served in France until he was wounded and later joined his uncle Frank who had been seconded to the Ministry of Pensions. Henry Ernest Leetham, a York businessman and the father-in-law of Noel Terry became chairman of Terry's from 1915 until his death in 1923 at which point Frank and Noel Terry resumed family control of the business. They restructured the company, launched new products, and bought a site in Bishopthorpe Road, York, on which to develop a new factory known as Terry's Chocolate Works. The new factory was built in an Art Deco style and included a distinctive clock tower. It was opened in 1926; new products included the Chocolate Apple (1926), Terry's Chocolate Orange (1932), and Terry's All Gold, which were developed and produced onsite.

Second World War
With the onset of the Second World War  The factory was taken over by F. Hills and Sons of Manchester as a shadow factory to manufacture and repair aircraft propeller blades. Confectionery production continued but was done for other companies; the Clementhorpe factory produced jellies for Chivers and Sons whilst chocolate was manufactured for Charbonnel et Walker. Production also included chocolate for troop and lifeboat rations.

Post-war era
After the war ended, the factory was handed back to the company. Production was difficult because of rationing and limited imports of raw cocoa. As a result, in 1954 production of the chocolate apple was phased out in favour of increased production of the chocolate orange. The Colgate-Palmolive Company acquired Joseph Terry & Sons Ltd. from Trust House Forte Ltd. in 1977. United Biscuits (Holdings) Ltd. (UB) acquired Joseph Terry & Sons Ltd. from Colgate in 1982; Terry's formed the bulk of their confectionery division. After UB ran into financial difficulties in the 1990s, they sold their confectionery division to Kraft Foods in 1993. Kraft amalgamated Terry's with Jacobs Suchard to create Terry's Suchard.

From 2000, the company brand was changed from Terry's of York to Terry's, reducing the company's links with York. Production was also scaled back to UK products and Terry's Chocolate Orange, Terry's All Gold, and Twilight made for the international market.

Closure
In 2004, Kraft Foods decided to absorb Terry's, move production of remaining products such as All Gold and Chocolate Orange to factories in Belgium, Sweden, Poland, and Slovakia, and close the plant. The factory closed on 30 September 2005 with the loss of 316 jobs.

In 2012, Kraft split into two companies; one called Kraft Foods Group and the other called Mondelēz International. After the split, Terry's became part of Mondelēz. In 2016, Terry's was one of a number of brands acquired by Eurazeo and it subsequently became part of Carambar & Co. Production of the Chocolate Orange was moved to the Caramber facilities in Strasbourg.

Terry's Chocolate Company Ltd
In February 2019, Carambar & Co set up a UK subsidiary called Terry's Chocolate Co to market the Terry's range in the UK market. The company is based in Finchley, London.

Locations

St Helen's Square

The business was based in St Helen's Square as early as 1818 in a building that served as both a shop and a factory until 1864 when production moved to the Clementhorpe site. The building was remodelled to include a ballroom and restaurant and in 1922 an Ashlar stone facade was added which included Corinthian columns and the name Terry was inscribed on the front of the building   This inscription is still present in 2019.
The premises was Grade II listed in 1974 but both the shop and restaurant closed in early 1981 and it was bought by the neighbouring Trustee Savings Bank who converted the restaurant into offices.
However it reopened as a restaurant in March 2017 and in August 2017 a blue plaque in honour of Joseph Terry the elder was added by York Civic Trust and unveiled by his great-great-great-grandson Anthony Terry.

Clementhorpe
The Clementhorpe factory was initially leased by the business in 1858 on what was the site of a former brewery and a new chocolate factory was built in 1862. A new five-storey building was added in 1920 and the factory continued to operate even after the business expanded to Bishopthorpe Road. 
After the factory closed the chimney was pulled down in 1974 and the rest of the site demolished in 1987. A Roman mosaic was discovered on the site at this time that Peter Terry had excavated to be preserved by the Yorkshire Museum.

Terry's Chocolate Works

In 1924 work began on the construction of the Terry's Chocolate Works on Bishopthorpe Road, York. These, along with the head office building were designated Grade II listed in March 2005 six months before the site closed.
The site was bought by developers Grantside and renamed The Chocolate Works. In February 2010, planning permission for a £165 million redevelopment of the site as a mixed-use of residential, commercial and leisure was given. Redevelopment started in 2011 with the removal of asbestos and the demolition of non-scheduled buildings in early 2012.
The main factory building underwent a £38 million redevelopment in which it was renamed as The Residence and the first apartments were made available in 2016. The main office building was converted into The Chocolate Works Care Village which opened in 2017.

Terry family
Sir Joseph Terry was Lord Mayor of York in 1874, 1885–86 and 1890.

Sir Francis Terry (Frank Terry) was High Sheriff of Yorkshire in 1945–46 and Peter Terry, son of Noel Terry, was High Sheriff of North Yorkshire in 1980–81.

References

Bibliography

External links

Terry's - Caramber & Co website

Mondelez International brands
Brand name confectionery
Food and drink companies established in 1767
Food and drink companies disestablished in 2005
Defunct companies of the United Kingdom
Yorkshire cuisine
History of York
Companies based in York
British chocolate companies
1767 establishments in Great Britain